Vysoká Pec is a municipality and village in Chomutov District in the Ústí nad Labem Region of the Czech Republic. It has about 1,100 inhabitants.

Administrative parts
Villages of Drmaly and Pyšná are administrative parts of Vysoká Pec.

Notable people
Kurt Hennrich (1931–2020), German alpine skier

Gallery

References

Villages in Chomutov District